The 1989 World Judo Championships were the 16th edition of the World Judo Championships, and were held in the Pionir Hall in Belgrade, Yugoslavia (now Serbia) from October 10–15, 1989.

Medal overview

Men

Women

Medal table

References

W
Judo
World Judo Championships
International sports competitions hosted by Yugoslavia
1989 in Serbia